Enrile is the surname of: 

Arturo Enrile (1940–1998), Filipino politician, cousin of Juan
Jack Enrile (born 1958), Filipino politician, son of Juan
Joaquín Ezpeleta Enrile (1788–?), Spanish politician and army general
Juan Ponce Enrile (born 1924), Filipino politician and lawyer
Pasqual Enrile y Alcedo (1772–1836), Spanish governor-general of the Philippines
Ronjay Enrile (born 1982), Filipino basketball player
Sally Ponce Enrile, Filipino politician, wife of Jack